Mahmoud Hekmatnia is an Iranian legal scholar and professor of law at the Research Institute for Islamic Culture and Thought. He is known for his works on intellectual property. His book titled Principles of Intellectual Property won the Farabi Award and Howzeh Book of the Year Award.

Works
 Philosophy of Women Legal System
 Popular vote: its foundation, validity and scope
 Theoretical foundations of intellectual property, 2007

References

External links
 Hekmatnia at the Research Institute for Islamic Culture and Thought

Living people
Farabi International Award recipients
Iranian legal scholars
Academic staff of the Research Institute for Islamic Culture and Thought
Year of birth missing (living people)